Verona is a township in Essex County in the U.S. state of New Jersey. As of the 2020 United States census, the township's population was 14,572, an increase of 1,240 (+9.3%) from the 2010 census count of 13,332, which in turn reflected a decline of 201 (−1.5%) from the 13,533 counted in the 2000 census.

History
Verona and several neighboring towns were all originally one consolidated area known as the Horseneck Tract. In 1702, a group of settlers left Newark and purchased a large tract of land northwest of their home city for the equivalent of a few hundred dollars from the Lenni Lenape Native Americans. This piece of land extended west and north to the Passaic River, south to the town center of what would become Livingston, and east to the First Watchung Mountain, and was called Horseneck by the natives because it resembled the neck and head of a horse. What was then known as Horseneck contained most of the present day northern Essex County towns: Verona, along with Caldwell, West Caldwell, Cedar Grove, Essex Fells, Fairfield, North Caldwell, and Roseland are all located entirely in Horseneck, and parts of what are today Livingston, Montclair, and West Orange also were contained in the Horseneck Tract.

After the Revolutionary War, the area of Horseneck was incorporated as "Caldwell Township" in honor of local war hero James Caldwell, a pastor who used pages from his church's bibles as wadding to ignite the ammo in soldiers' cannons and helped to drive the British out of Horseneck.

The area of present-day Verona was part of what was known in the 1800s as Vernon Valley. The name was rejected when residents applied to the United States Postal Service, as the name had already been in use for an area in Sussex County. Verona was chosen as the alternative name for the community. The township's name is derived from Verona, Italy.

At various times between 1798 and 1892, issues arose which caused dissatisfaction between the Caldwell and Verona areas. These included a desire of the citizens of Verona to more closely control their own governmental affairs. With the population growing, Verona needed to centrally locate essential services such as schools and places of worship; problems with the water supply; and the disposition of road repair funds. On February 17, 1892, the citizens of Verona voted to secede from Caldwell Township to form Verona Township. Further growth and the need for a water system and other public utilities found Verona moving ahead of the other half of the township and in 1902 the two areas decided to separate into two separate municipalities: Verona Township and Verona Borough. It took two sessions of the state legislature to approve the new borough, but on April 18, 1907, the borough of Verona was approved by an act of the New Jersey Legislature, pending the results of a referendum held on April 30, 1907, in which the new borough passed by a 224–77 margin. Residents of the newly formed borough had sought to disassociate themselves from the Overbrook County Insane Asylum and the Newark City Home (a reform school), as well as from the settlement of Cedar Grove, which was considered a settlement of farmers. On April 9, 1908, Verona Township changed its name to Cedar Grove Township.

In 1981, the borough was one of seven Essex County municipalities to pass a referendum to become a township, joining four municipalities that had already made the change, of what would ultimately be more than a dozen Essex County municipalities to reclassify themselves as townships in order take advantage of federal revenue sharing policies that allocated townships a greater share of government aid to municipalities on a per capita basis. As an example of the potential benefits of switching to a township, Verona Borough received $213,000 in federal aid in 1976, while similarly sized Cedar Grove Township received $1.24 million. Today, Verona uses just "Township of Verona" in most official documents.

Geography
According to the United States Census Bureau, the township had a total area of 2.82 square miles (7.29 km2), including 2.79 square miles (7.24 km2) of land and 0.02 square miles (0.05 km2) of water (0.74%).

Unincorporated communities, localities and place names located partially or completely within the township include Hillcrest and Verona Lake.

The township is bordered by Cedar Grove Township, Essex Fells, Montclair Township, North Caldwell and West Orange Township. Verona lies between two mountains, the First and Second Watchung Mountains with a small river, the Peckman, flowing at the bottom of the valley towards the Passaic River at Little Falls.

Climate
Verona has a temperate climate, with warm/hot humid summers and cool/cold winters.  The climate is slightly cooler overall during the summer than in New York City because there is no urban heat island effect.

January tends to be the coldest month, with average high temperatures in the upper 30s (Fahrenheit) and lows in the lower 20s. July is the warmest months with high temperatures in the mid 80s and lows in the mid 60s. From April to June and from September to early November, Verona enjoys temperatures from the lower 60s to upper 70s. Rainfall is plentiful, with around  a year. Snowfall is common from mid-January to early March and nor'easters can bring significant amounts of snow.

Demographics

2010 census

The Census Bureau's 2006–2010 American Community Survey showed that (in 2010 inflation-adjusted dollars) median household income was $93,839 (with a margin of error of +/− $6,753) and the median family income was $126,000 (+/− $9,193). Males had a median income of $71,917 (+/− $9,659) versus $52,433 (+/− $5,765) for females. The per capita income for the township was $47,689 (+/− $3,282). About 1.8% of families and 2.3% of the population were below the poverty line, including 0.7% of those under age 18 and 6.2% of those age 65 or over.

2000 census
As of the 2000 United States census there were 13,533 people, 5,585 households, and 3,697 families residing in the township. The population density was 4,917.4 people per square mile (1,900.0/km2). There were 5,719 housing units at an average density of 2,078.1 per square mile (803.0/km2). The racial makeup of the township was 92.99% White, 1.53% African American, 0.02% Native American, 3.41% Asian, 0.06% Pacific Islander, 0.71% from other races, and 1.27% from two or more races. Hispanic or Latino of any race were 3.45% of the population.

There were 5,585 households, out of which 29.4% had children under the age of 18 living with them, 56.3% were married couples living together, 7.3% had a female householder with no husband present, and 33.8% were non-families. 30.0% of all households were made up of individuals, and 15.8% had someone living alone who was 65 years of age or older. The average household size was 2.42 and the average family size was 3.06.

In the township the population was spread out, with 22.5% under the age of 18, 4.3% from 18 to 24, 28.8% from 25 to 44, 25.1% from 45 to 64, and 19.3% who were 65 years of age or older. The median age was 41 years. For every 100 females, there were 89.1 males. For every 100 females age 18 and over, there were 83.8 males.

The median income for a household in the township was $74,619, and the median income for a family was $97,673. Males had a median income of $60,434 versus $43,196 for females. The per capita income for the township was $41,202, making it the eighth highest community in Essex County and 95th highest in the State of New Jersey. About 1.4% of families and 3.3% of the population were below the poverty line, including 2.6% of those under age 18 and 6.2% of those age 65 or over.

Economy
Annin & Co. is the world's oldest & largest flag manufacturer and had its main manufacturing plant in Verona from 1916 to 2013. The building was sold and redeveloped as apartments, which opened to tenants in 2018. Annin is the official flag manufacturer to the United Nations, and a major supplier to the United States Government. Annin produced flags that were used on Iwo Jima, at the North and South Poles, atop Mount Everest and the rubble of the World Trade Center. Annin's Verona factory also produced 186 stick flags that were carried to the moon in the Apollo 11 lunar lander and later distributed as mementos of the first moon landing. Annin does not claim that the flag planted on the moon was produced by Annin, either in Verona or at a plant in Bloomfield, NJ that was operating at the time, although the company's current president says that it has been assured by multiple sources that it was. The stars sections of all Annin flags were produced in Verona then. Annin President Carter Beard recently said that uniforms of the Apollo 11 astronauts were decorated with a silk-screened patch that may have been produced in Verona.

Parks and recreation

 Eagle Rock Reservation,  a  forest reserve and recreational park. Most of this reservation is in West Orange or in Montclair.
 Everett Field, a small baseball and football park dedicated to the family who donated the land to the township.
 Hilltop Reservation, opened in spring 2003, is composed of lands in the grounds of the former Essex Mountain Sanatorium, is home to many hiking and mountain biking trails.
 Verona Park, the fifth-largest in the Essex County Park System, it was designed by the same designer as Central Park in New York City.
 Lenape Trail, a trail that runs from the Pulaski Skyway in Newark to the Passaic River in Roseland. The Verona section runs from the West Essex Trail, down and through Verona Park, and up toward Eagle Rock Reservation before entering West Orange.
 Verona Community Center, built in 1997, provides a gym, game room, ballroom, and conference room for any group or organization. also adjacent are:
 Veteran's Field, a grass turf field, provides two softball/baseball fields as well as an athletic field
 Centennial Field, an artificial turf field, opened in 2007.
 Liberty Field, an artificial turf field, opened in 2015.
 Freedom Field, an artificial turf field, opened in 2016.
 Verona Pool, features an Olympic-size swimming pool of various depths, with two water slides and two springboards, as well as a wading pool for younger children; playground, volleyball, basketball, racquetball and shuffleboard courts, in addition to ping-pong tables, full showers and a snackbar
 West Essex Trail, acquired in 1985 through Green Acres funding, is a  trail which runs from Arnold Way in Verona to the Passaic County line near the Lenape Trail, on the former right-of-way of the Caldwell Branch of the old Erie Lackawanna Railroad.

Government

Local government
Verona operates within the Faulkner Act, formally known as the Optional Municipal Charter Law, under the Council-Manager form of New Jersey municipal government. The township is one of 42 municipalities (of the 564) statewide that use this form of government. The governing body is comprised of the five-member Township Council, who are elected at-large on a non-partisan basis to staggered four-year terms of office, with either two or three seats coming up for election in odd-numbered years as part of the May municipal election. At a reorganization meeting held on July 1 after each election, the council selects a mayor and deputy mayor from among its members.

, the members of the Verona Township Council are Mayor Alex Roman (term on council and as mayor ends June 30, 2023), Deputy Mayor Christine McGrath (term on council and as deputy mayor ends 2023), Cynthia Holland (2025), Jack McEvoy (2025) and Christopher Tamburro (2025).

The day-to-day operations of the township are supervised by Township Manager Joseph D'Arco, who serves as chief executive officer.

Federal, state, and county representation
Verona is located in the 10th Congressional District and is part of New Jersey's 26th state legislative district. 

Prior to the 2011 reapportionment following the 2010 Census, Verona had been in the 40th state legislative district.

Politics
As of March 2011, there were a total of 9,911 registered voters in Verona, of which 3,194 (32.2%) were registered as Democrats, 2,329 (23.5%) were registered as Republicans and 4,387 (44.3%) were registered as Unaffiliated. There were no voters registered as Libertarians or Greens.

In the 2012 presidential election, Democrat Barack Obama received 50.3% of the vote (3,662 cast), ahead of Republican Mitt Romney with 48.9% (3,563 votes), and other candidates with 0.8% (61 votes), among the 7,366 ballots cast by the township's 10,396 registered voters (80 ballots were spoiled), for a turnout of 70.9%. In the 2008 presidential election, Republican John McCain received 49.6% of the vote (3,730 cast), ahead of Democrat Barack Obama with 48.8% (3,664 votes) and other candidates with 0.8% (57 votes), among the 7,515 ballots cast by the township's 9,750 registered voters, for a turnout of 77.1%. In the 2004 presidential election, Republican George W. Bush received 51.4% of the vote (3,900 ballots cast), outpolling Democrat John Kerry with 47.4% (3,597 votes) and other candidates with 0.7% (67 votes), among the 7,587 ballots cast by the township's 9,697 registered voters, for a turnout percentage of 78.2.

In the 2013 gubernatorial election, Republican Chris Christie received 59.2% of the vote (2,645 cast), ahead of Democrat Barbara Buono with 39.6% (1,768 votes), and other candidates with 1.3% (56 votes), among the 4,527 ballots cast by the township's 10,442 registered voters (58 ballots were spoiled), for a turnout of 43.4%. In the 2009 gubernatorial election, Republican Chris Christie received 49.1% of the vote (2,521 ballots cast), ahead of  Democrat Jon Corzine with 40.1% (2,062 votes), Independent Chris Daggett with 9.4% (482 votes) and other candidates with 0.8% (43 votes), among the 5,137 ballots cast by the township's 9,738 registered voters, yielding a 52.8% turnout.

Current and previous mayors

Education

Public schools
The Verona Public Schools is the public school district in Verona, which serves students in pre-kindergarten through twelfth grade. The district has six campuses: four neighborhood elementary schools, one middle school and one high school. As of the 2020–21 school year, the district, comprised of six schools, had an enrollment of 2,211 students and 182.3 classroom teachers (on an FTE basis), for a student–teacher ratio of 12.1:1. Schools in the district (with 2020–21 enrollment data from the National Center for Education Statistics) are 
Brookdale Avenue School with 131 students in grades K–4, 
Frederic N. Brown School with 274 students in grades K–4, 
Forest Avenue School with 213 students in grades K–4, 
Laning Avenue School with 233 students in grades Pre-K–4, 
Henry B. Whitehorne Middle School with 643 students in grades 5–8 and 
Verona High School with 686 students in grades 9–12. 

The high school mascot is the "Hillbilly". However, this mascot has become controversial as a result of opposition from previous school Superintendent Earl Kim. In the face of community support for the traditional name, the mascot was retained. The original mascot was depicted with a rifle and jug of moonshine. The rifle and jug and have been replaced with a fishing pole and a dog.

The district has been recognized on three occasions with the Best Practice Award, honoring specific practices implemented by a district for exemplary and/or innovative strategies. In addition, three schools in the district was named a "Star School" by the New Jersey Department of Education, the highest honor that a New Jersey school can achieve. The school was the 70th-ranked public high school in New Jersey out of 328 schools statewide in New Jersey Monthly magazine's September 2012 cover story on the state's "Top Public High Schools", after being ranked 53rd in 2010 out of 322 schools listed.

In 2020, Verona High School was the 31st-ranked public high school in New Jersey out of 305 schools statewide.

Private schools
Founded in 1924 and located near Verona Park, Our Lady of the Lake Catholic School serves students in pre-school through eighth grade, operating under the auspices of the Roman Catholic Archdiocese of Newark. The school was recognized by the National Blue Ribbon Schools Program in 2011, one of 305 schools recognized nationwide and one of 14 selected from New Jersey. The school was honored a second time when it was one of eight private schools recognized in 2017 as an Exemplary High Performing School by the Blue Ribbon Schools Program of the United States Department of Education.

The Children's Institute (TCI) is a private, non-profit school approved by the New Jersey Department of Education, serving children facing learning, language and social challenges, for children ages 3–21. Dating back to an orphanage founded in 1883 in Newark, New Jersey, the school moved to Verona in 1999 after remodeling a building that had been donated by Hoffmann-LaRoche.

Transportation

Roads and highways

Within the limits of the township lies Route 23 and CR 506 which runs directly through the township. CR 577 runs through the southeastern portion of Verona. Other highways near Verona include the Garden State Parkway, Interstate 80 and the New Jersey Turnpike.

Public transportation
NJ Transit bus routes 11 and 29 serve the township, providing service to and from Newark. In September 2012, as part of budget cuts, NJ Transit suspended service to Newark on the 75 line.

DeCamp Bus Lines offers commuter service on their 33 bus route between West Caldwell and the Port Authority Bus Terminal in Midtown Manhattan.

Train stations, also run by New Jersey Transit, are located in the neighboring towns of Little Falls and Montclair. Prior to 1966, the Erie Railroad's Caldwell Branch (a part of New York and Greenwood Lake Railway) ran passenger service through Verona from Great Notch. The line was removed in 1979 after a washout four years prior. On July 14, 2010, the township of Verona announced that it was honoring the old freight shed at the Verona station, the last standing structure of the railroad. The project of naming it a historic landmark in Verona, the first of many proposed by the Verona Landmarks Preservation Commission. Proposals include moving the structure to a more accessible place in Verona or turning the shed into a one-room museum.

In the early 20th century, Verona was serviced by a trolley line which operated on Bloomfield Avenue. The tracks still lie underneath the roadway, and are visible when the roadway is under construction.

Local media

Newspaper
Verona is served by two weekly newspapers: The Verona-Cedar Grove Times and the Verona Observer. The Star-Ledger, the largest newspaper in New Jersey, covers major news stories that occur in Verona.

Internet
Local news is covered by the Verona-Cedar Grove Times, www.myveronanj.com, www.verona.patch.com, and by the official township website.

Radio
Verona falls in the New York Market, as well as the Morristown Market.

Television
Verona Cable television is served by Comcast of New Jersey. However, in 2007, Verizon introduced its Verizon FiOS service to the township. Comcast Channel 35 & Verizon FiOS Channel 24 is Verona Television (VTV) a Government-access television (GATV) channel that runs council meetings, school board meetings and community functions, as well as any other Verona-related Public-access television videos submitted by the residents. VTV is maintained by the Verona Public Library.

Community services
 The Verona Fire Department is one of the largest fully volunteer fire departments in Essex County, staffed by over 60 firefighters. They have two stations, three engines, one ladder truck, one reserve engine, one brush truck, one utility truck, two command vehicles, and a heavy rescue. The department, founded in 1909 shortly after Verona was created, celebrated its 100th year of service in 2009.
 The Verona Rescue Squad (volunteer) has three ambulances, two EMS bikes, one first responder vehicle and one command vehicle in one station on Church Street. Formed in 1927 it is one of the oldest EMS organizations in the state. Boasting over 120 members it is one of the largest volunteer EMS agencies in the area.
 The main street in Verona is Bloomfield Avenue, where the Town Hall, Library, Middle School, and many shops, restaurants, and businesses are located.
 During the American Revolutionary War, George Washington and his troops used Eagle Rock Reservation as one of a chain of observation posts to monitor British troop movements.
 The Essex Mountain Sanatorium opened in 1902 as the Newark City Home for Girls. With tuberculosis spreading through Newark, the site was converted into a sanatorium in 1907, against the wishes of local residents. Its location at the highest point in Essex County was believed to be beneficial and the facility was known for its high recovery rate before it closed in 1977.

Notable people

People who were born in, residents of, or otherwise closely associated with Verona include:

 Tommy Albelin (born 1964), NHL defenseman for New Jersey Devils and coach of De Paul High School hockey team
 Kevin Bannon (born 1957), former men's college basketball head coach who was the Rutgers Scarlet Knights men's basketball team's head coach from 1997 through 2001
 Leila T. Bauman, painter
 John C. Bogle (1929–2019), founder of The Vanguard Group
 Bill Bradley (born 1943), Olympic gold medalist at the 1964 Summer Olympics, professional basketball player for the New York Knicks, member of the Basketball Hall of Fame, US Senator from New Jersey, and 2000 Presidential hopeful
 Lorinda Cherry (1944–2022), computer scientist and programmer who spent much of her career at Bell Labs
 Marion Crecco (1930–2015), member of the New Jersey General Assembly from 1986 to 2002
 Jay Curtis (1950–2018), author, producer, writer, director and actor, who co-directed 75-0: The Documentary, about a 1966 loss by a score of 75–0 to Madison High School, part of a 32-game losing streak
 Peter David (born 1956), science fiction and fantasy author who has used Verona as location in his fiction, such as location of villain Morgan le Fay in his first novel, Knight Life
 Dan DePalma (born 1989), wide receiver who has played for the Saskatchewan Roughriders of the Canadian Football League
 Mary Dunleavy (born 1966), operatic soprano
 Anthony Fasano (born 1984), tight end for Tennessee Titans
 Jed Graef (born 1942), swimmer, gold medalist in 200m backstroke at 1964 Summer Olympics in Tokyo
 Barbara J. Griffiths (born 1949), diplomat who was the United States Ambassador to Iceland from 1999 to 2002
 Fred Hill Jr. (born 1959), coached Rutgers Scarlet Knights men's basketball team
 Fred Hill Sr. (1934–2019), former head coach of the Rutgers Scarlet Knights baseball team
 Philip E. Hoffman (1908–1993), lawyer who served as national president of the American Jewish Committee and as American Ambassador to the United Nations Human Rights Council
 Fred Krupp, president of the Environmental Defense Fund, spent childhood in Verona
 Archie Lochhead (1892–1971), first director of the Exchange Stabilization Fund and President of the Universal Trading Corporation
 John MacLean (born 1964),  player and assistant coach for NHL's New Jersey Devils
 Phyllis Mangina (born 1959), college basketball coach who is currently an assistant women's basketball coach at Saint Peter's
 Elmer Matthews (1927–2015), lawyer and politician who served three terms in the New Jersey General Assembly
 Jay Mohr (born 1970), actor, comedian and radio personality
 Jon Okafor (born 1989), professional soccer midfielder
 Eugénie Olson, novelist and editor
 Henry Orenstein (1923–2021), professional poker player, helped push Hasbro to produce Transformers
 Kal Parekh, film and television actor who played the role of Sanjeev, an Indian-American flight engineer in the ABC television series, Pan Am, set in the 1960s
 Kenneth Posner, lighting designer for such Broadway shows as Wicked, Legally Blonde, The Pirate Queen, and The Coast of Utopia, the latter of which won him a Tony award
 Brian Rafalski (born 1973), hockey player, New Jersey Devils defenseman
 Saul Robbins (1922–2010), toy manufacturer, co-founder of Remco
 John Roosma (1900–1983), captain of Ernest Blood's "Wonder Teams" who became first college player to total 1,000 points for his career while at United States Military Academy
 Joel Rosenblatt, musician best known as the longtime drummer for the jazz-fusion band Spyro Gyra
 David M. Satz Jr. (1926–2009), lawyer who served as U.S. Attorney for District of New Jersey from 1961 to 1969
 Brenda Shaughnessy (born 1970), poet
 Donald J. Strait (1918–2015), flying ace in the 356th Fighter Group during World War II and a career officer in the United States Air Force
 Craig Morgan Teicher (born 1979), author, poet and literary critic whose poetry collection, The Trembling Answers, won the Lenore Marshall Poetry Prize in 2018
 Rod Trafford (born 1978), former NFL tight end who played for the Buffalo Bills and the New England Patriots
 Chris Wylde (born 1976), actor and comedian

In popular culture
 The HBO crime drama The Sopranos was set in the area, and the storyline often included scenes filmed in Verona. Livia Soprano's house is in Verona in the series pilot, and a Verona Rescue Squad ambulance is seen when she dies in the episode "Proshai, Livushka". In the episode "Cold Cuts", it's established that Bobby Baccalieri and Janice Soprano live in Verona.
 The 1987 horror movie Doom Asylum was filmed at the now demolished Essex Mountain Sanatorium.
 Pizza My Heart, an ABC Family movie, is a contemporary retelling of Romeo and Juliet, that is set in Verona (New Jersey, not Italy). Although the storyline is set in Verona, it was actually filmed in New Orleans, Louisiana.
 The original, unaired pilot of the television show Strangers With Candy, "Retardation: A Celebration", was filmed at Verona High School. The VHS signboard is also used in almost every episode thereafter to display various witticisms, although the name has been changed to that of the school in the show, Flatpoint High School.
 Pearl, the hairdresser in "The Saturdays" by Elizabeth Enright (1941), says she ran away from her abusive stepmother in Verona and went to New York City with her brother Perry.

References

External links

 Official Website of the Township of Verona
 Verona Public Schools
 
 School Data for the Verona Public Schools, National Center for Education Statistics
 Verona Fire Department
 Verona Rescue Squad
 Verona Illustrated History
 Verona-Cedar Grove Times (Local Newspaper)
 Verona Observer (Local Newspaper)
 Verona Codes & Ordinances

 
1907 establishments in New Jersey
Faulkner Act (council–manager)
Populated places established in 1907
Townships in Essex County, New Jersey